Dependent personality disorder (DPD) is characterized by a pervasive psychological dependence on other people. This personality disorder is a long-term condition in which people depend on others to meet their emotional and physical needs, with only a minority achieving normal levels of independence. Dependent personality disorder is a cluster C personality disorder, which is characterized by excessive fear and anxiety. It begins prior to early adulthood, and it is present in a variety of contexts and is associated with inadequate functioning. Symptoms can include anything from extreme passivity, devastation or helplessness when relationships end, avoidance of responsibilities and severe submission.

Signs and symptoms
People who have dependent personality disorder are overdependent on other people when it comes to making decisions. They cannot make a decision on their own as they need constant approval from other people. Consequently, individuals diagnosed with DPD tend to place needs and opinions of others above their own as they do not have the confidence to trust their decisions. This kind of behaviour can explain why people with DPD tend to show passive and clingy behaviour. These individuals display a fear of separation and cannot stand being alone. When alone, they experience feelings of isolation and loneliness due to their overwhelming dependence on other people. Generally people with DPD are also pessimistic: they expect the worst out of situations or believe that the worst will happen. They tend to be more introverted and are more sensitive to criticism and fear rejection.

Risk factors
People with a history of neglect and an abusive upbringing are more susceptible to develop DPD, specifically those involved in long-term abusive relationships. Those with overprotective or authoritarian parents are also more at risk to develop DPD. Having a family history of anxiety disorder can play a role in the development of DPD as a 2004 twin study found a 0.81 heritability for personality disorders collectively.

Causes
The exact cause of dependent personality disorder is unknown. A study in 2012 estimated that between 55% and 72% of the risk of the condition is inherited from one's parents. The difference between a "dependent personality" and a "dependent personality disorder" is somewhat subjective, which makes diagnosis sensitive to cultural influences such as gender role expectations.

Dependent traits in children tended to increase with parenting behaviours and attitudes characterized by overprotectiveness and authoritarianism. Thus the likelihood of developing dependent personality disorder increased, since these parenting traits can limit them from developing a sense of autonomy, rather teaching them that others are powerful and competent.

Traumatic or adverse experiences early in an individual's life, such as neglect and abuse or serious illness, can increase the likelihood of developing personality disorders, including dependent personality disorder, later on in life. This is especially prevalent for those individuals who also experience high interpersonal stress and poor social support.

There is a higher frequency of the disorder seen in women than men, hence expectations relating to gender role may contribute to some extent.

Diagnosis
Clinicians and clinical researchers conceptualize dependent personality disorder in terms of four related components:
 Cognitive: a perception of oneself as powerless and ineffectual, coupled with the belief that other people are comparatively powerful and potent.
 Motivational: a desire to obtain and maintain relationships with protectors and caregivers.
 Behavioral: a pattern of relationship-facilitating behavior designed to strengthen interpersonal ties and minimize the possibility of abandonment and rejection.
 Emotional: fear of abandonment, fear of rejection, and anxiety regarding evaluation by figures of authority.

American Psychiatric Association and DSM
The Diagnostic and Statistical Manual of Mental Disorders (DSM) contains a dependent personality disorder diagnosis. It refers to a pervasive and excessive need to be taken care of which leads to submissive and clinging behavior and fears of separation. This begins prior to early adulthood and can be present in a variety of contexts.

In the DSM Fifth Edition (DSM-5), there is one criterion by which there are eight features of dependent personality disorder. The disorder is indicated by at least five of the following factors:
 Has difficulty making everyday decisions without an excessive amount of advice and reassurance from others.
 Needs others to assume responsibility for most major areas of their life.
 Has difficulty expressing disagreement with others because of fear of loss of support or approval.
 Has difficulty initiating projects or doing things on their own (because of a lack of self confidence in judgment or abilities rather than a lack of motivation or energy).
 Goes to excessive lengths to obtain nurturance and support from others, to the point of volunteering to do things that are unpleasant.
 Feels uncomfortable or helpless when alone because of exaggerated fears of being unable to care for themselves.
 Urgently seeks another relationship as a source of care and support when a close relationship ends.
 Is unrealistically preoccupied with fears of being left to take care of themselves.

The diagnosis of personality disorders in the fourth edition Diagnostic and Statistical Manual of Mental Disorders, including dependent personality disorder, was found to be problematic due to reasons such as excessive diagnostic comorbidity, inadequate coverage, arbitrary boundaries with normal psychological functioning, and heterogeneity among individuals within the same categorial diagnosis.

World Health Organization
The World Health Organization's ICD-10 lists dependent personality disorder as  Dependent personality disorder:

It is characterized by at least 4 of the following:

 Encouraging or allowing others to make most of one's important life decisions;
 Subordination of one's own needs to those of others on whom one is dependent, and undue compliance with their wishes;
 Unwillingness to make even reasonable demands on the people one depends on;
 Feeling uncomfortable or helpless when alone, because of exaggerated fears of inability to care for oneself;
 Preoccupation with fears of being abandoned by a person with whom one has a close relationship, and of being left to care for oneself;
 Limited capacity to make everyday decisions without an excessive amount of advice and reassurance from others.

Associated features may include perceiving oneself as helpless, incompetent, and lacking stamina.

Includes:
 Asthenic, inadequate, passive, and self-defeating personality (disorder)

It is a requirement of ICD-10 that a diagnosis of any specific personality disorder also satisfies a set of general personality disorder criteria.

SWAP-200
The SWAP-200 is a diagnostic tool that was proposed with the goal of overcoming limitations, such as limited external validity for the diagnostic criteria for dependent personality disorder, to the DSM. It serves as a possible alternative nosological system that emerged from the efforts to create an empirically based approach to personality disorders – while also preserving the complexity of clinical reality. Dependent personality disorder is considered a clinical prototype in the context of the SWAP-200. Rather than discrete symptoms, it provides composite description characteristic criteria – such as personality tendencies.

Based on the Q-Sort method and prototype matching, the SWAP-200 is a personality assessment procedure relying on an external observer's judgment. It provides:
 A personality diagnosis expressed as the matching with ten prototypical descriptions of DSM-IV personality disorders.
 A personality diagnosis based on the matching of the patient with 11 Q-factors of personality derived empirically.
 A dimensional profile of healthy and adaptive functioning.
The traits that define dependent personality disorder according to SWAP-200 are:
 They tend to become attached quickly and/or intensely, developing feelings and expectations that are not warranted by the history or context of the relationship.
 Since they tend to be ingratiating and submissive, people with DPD tend to be in relationships in which they are emotionally or physically abused.
 They tend to feel ashamed, inadequate, and depressed.
 They also feel powerless and tend to be suggestible.
 They are often anxious and tend to feel guilty.
 These people have difficulty acknowledging and expressing anger and struggle to get their own needs and goals met.
 Unable to soothe or comfort themselves when distressed, they require involvement of another person to help regulate their emotions.

Psychodynamic Diagnostic Manual
The Psychodynamic Diagnostic Manual (PDM) approaches dependent personality disorder in a descriptive, rather than prescriptive sense and has received empirical support. The Psychodynamic Diagnostic Manual includes two different types of dependent personality disorder:
 Passive-aggressive
 Counter-dependent 
The PDM-2 adopts and applies a prototypic approach, using empirical measures like the SWAP-200. It was influenced by a developmental and empirically grounded perspective, as proposed by Sidney Blatt. This model is of particular interest when focusing on dependent personality disorder, claiming that psychopathology comes from distortions of two main coordinates of psychological development:
 The anaclitic/introjective dimension.
 The relatedness/self-definition dimension.
The anaclitic personality organization in individuals exhibits difficulties in interpersonal relatedness, exhibiting the following behaviours:
 Preoccupation with relationships
 Fear of abandonment and of rejection
 Seeking closeness and intimacy
 Difficulty managing interpersonal boundaries
 Tend to have an anxious-preoccupied attachment style.
Introjective personality style is associated with problems in self-definition.

Differential diagnosis
There are similarities between individuals with dependent personality disorder and individuals with borderline personality disorder, in that they both have a fear of abandonment. Those with dependent personality disorder do not exhibit impulsive behaviour, unstable affect, and poor self-image experienced by those with borderline personality disorder, differentiating the two disorders.

Treatment
People who have DPD are generally treated with psychotherapy. The main goal of this therapy is to make the individual more independent and help them form healthy relationships with the people around them. This is done by improving their self-esteem and confidence.

Medication can be used to treat patients with depression or anxiety because of their DPD, but this does not treat the core problems caused by DPD.

Epidemiology
Based on a recent survey of 43,093 Americans, 0.49% of adults meet diagnostic criteria for DPD (National Epidemiologic Survey on Alcohol and Related Conditions; NESARC; Grant et al., 2004). 
Traits related to DPD, like most personality disorders, emerge in childhood or early adulthood. Findings from the NESArC study found that 18 to 29 year olds have a greater chance of developing DPD. DPD is more common among women compared to men as 0.6% of women have DPD compared to 0.4% of men.

A 2004 twin study suggests a heritability of 0.81 for developing dependent personality disorder. Because of this, there is significant evidence that this disorder runs in families.

Children and adolescents with a history of anxiety disorders and physical illnesses are more susceptible to acquiring this disorder.

Millon's subtypes
Psychologist Theodore Millon identified five adult subtypes of dependent personality disorder. Any individual dependent may exhibit none or one of the following:

History
The conceptualization of dependency, within classical psychoanalytic theory, is directly related to Freud's oral psychosexual stage of development. Frustration or over-gratification was said to result in an oral fixation and in an oral type of character, characterized by feeling dependent on others for nurturance and by behaviours representative of the oral stage. Later psychoanalytic theories shifted the focus from a drive-based approach of dependency to the recognition of the importance of early relationships and establishing separation from these early caregivers, in which the exchanges between the caregiver and the child become internalized, and the nature of these interactions becomes part of the concepts of the self and of others.

References

Sources

External links

J. Christopher Perry, M.P.H., M.D., 2005 (Dependent Personality Disorder)
Diagnostic Features, Complications, Prevalence, Associated Laboratory Findings
MedlinePlus Medical Encyclopedia: Dependent personality disorder

Cluster C personality disorders